

The 2022 Nürburgring 24 Hours (officially known as ADAC Totalenergies 24h Race at the Nürburgring Nordschleife for sponsorship reasons) was the 50th running of the Nürburgring 24 Hours and took place over 28–29 May 2022.

Entry list

Qualifying

Top Qualifying / Starting Group 1

  The #44 Falken Motorsports received a 5-place grid penalty for overtaking under yellow flag.
  The #1 Manthey Racing was required to start the race from the back of the starting group for exceeding double yellow flag speed limit.
  The #100 Walkenhorst Motorsport was required to start the race from the back of the starting group for exceeding Code 60 speed limit.

Starting Group 2

  The #125 Huber Motorsport was required to start the race from the back of the starting group for exceeding Code 60 speed limit.
  All qualifying time by #830 Hyundai Motorsport N was cancelled for repeatedly exceeding speed limit.
  The #220 Giti Tire Motorsport By WS Racing was required to start the race from the back of the starting group for exceeding Code 60 speed limit.
  The #81 PROsport Racing was required to start the race from the back of the starting group for exceeding Code 60 speed limit.
  The #150 Dörr Motorsport was required to start the race from the back of the starting group for exceeding Code 60 speed limit.
  The #135 Clickversicherung Team was required to start the race from the back of the starting group for exceeding Code 60 speed limit.
  The #122 Black Falcon was required to start the race from the back of the starting group for exceeding Code 60 speed limit.
  The #160 Teichmann Racing GTX was required to start the race from pit lane after the starting group for repeatedly exceeding Code 60 speed limit.
  The #121 Black Falcon Team IDENTICA was required to start the race from pit lane after the starting group and received 2-minutes race penalty for repeatedly exceeding Code 60 speed limit.
  The #85 Black Falcon Team TEXTAR was required to start the race from pit lane after the starting group and received 2-minutes race penalty for repeatedly exceeding Code 60 speed limit.

Starting Group 3

  The #140 Pit Lane - AMC Sankt Vith was required to start the race from the back of the starting group for exceeding Code 60 speed limit.
  The #227 Team Sorg Rennsport was required to start the race from the back of the starting group for exceeding Code 60 speed limit.
  The #115 MSC Sinzig e.V. im ADAC was required to start the race from pit lane after the starting group for repeatedly exceeding Code 60 speed limit.
  The #331 Adrenalin Motorsport Team Alzner Automotive was required to start the race from pit lane after the starting group and received 2-minutes race penalty for repeatedly exceeding Code 60 speed limit.

Race results

Entries in bold are class winners.
Drivers in italics were entered in cars that completed the race, however did not complete the required two laps to be classified as a finisher.

References

External links
 

2022
Nürburgring 24 Hours
Nürburgring 24 Hours